This is list of Indian animated films. It includes theatrical films, some important short films, direct-to-video releases and International films in which Indian production houses and studios were involved.

Notable short films

Feature films

International co-productions

Upcoming films

Unreleased/shelved films

Live action films with animated sequence(s)

TV films

Cartoon Network

 Arjun and the Adventure of Ice Lotus
 Ashoka the Hero
 Batu Gaiden
 Chakra: The Invincible
 Kid Krrish: The Rise (2 October 2013) 	
 Kid Krrish: Mission Bhutan (19 July 2014) 	
 Kid Krrish: Mystery in Mongolia (27 September 2014)
 Kid Krrish: Shakalaka Africa (25 April 2015)
Krishna (film series)
Krishna: The Birth
 Krishna in Vrindavan
 Krishna: Kansa Vadha	
 Krishna: Maakhan Chor
 My Name Is Raj 	
 My Name Is Raj 2	
 My Name Is Raj 3: Attack of Demons
 My Name Is Raj 4: Vizukama Ki Takaar (17 March 2014)	
 My Name is Raj 5: Return of Zohak (19 April 2015)
 Roll No 21 and the Quest for Swarnamani	
 Roll No 21 -Space Mein Dhoom Dhadaka  (11 January 2014) 	
 Roll No 21: Time Ki Bhool Bhulaiya  	
 Roll No:21 - Ticket to Australia (31 January 2015) 	
 Lights, camera, Roll No 21 - Kris in Bollywood 	
 Roll No 21 Scooba Dooba Ajooba 	
 Roll No 21 Ticket To China 	
 Roll No 21 Ticket To Japan
 Roll No 21 Voyage To Aquatica	
 Roll No 21 Get Set Go Kris
 Roll No 21 Kris Aur Phantom Ka Raaz	
 Roll No 21 Kris Aur Shoonya Registan
 Tripura - The Three Cities of Maya (20 January 2011)
Vikram Betal

Discovery Kids
Little Singham Aur Kaal Ka Mahajaal
Little Singham Mission Jai Hind
Little Singham Desh Ka Sipaahi
Little Singham Chala London

Disney Channel
Apna Bhai Gaju Bhai 
Feluda: The Kathmandu Caper

DD National
Krish Trish & Baltiboy

Hungama TV
Chacha Bhatija Khazane Ki Khoj
Chacha Bhatija Golmaal Hai Bhai Sab Golmaal Hai
Fatak Patak: Sheru Aur Alienoid Gabru
Fatak Patak: Sheru Aur Eagon Ka Aakraman
Fatak Patak: Sheru Aur Titan Taapu Ka Rahasya
Fatak Patak: Sheru Aur Baaku Ka Kala Saya

Nickelodeon India

 Motu Patlu in Wonderland!
 Motu Patlu: Mission Moon 
 Motu Patlu: Deep Sea Adventure
 Motu Patlu: Kung-Fu Kings
 Motu Patlu: Khazaane Ki Race
 Motu Patlu: Kung Fu Kings Returns
 Motu Patlu: Carnival Island! 
 Motu Patlu: 36 Ghante Race
 Motu Patlu Alien World! 
 Motu Patlu in Double Trouble 
 Motu Patlu: The Invisible Plane
Pakdam Pakdai Doggy Don vs Billiman
 Pakdam Pakdai Ocean Attack

Rudra: Dawn of the Dangerous Dongreela
Rudra: Return of the Cage Magician

Pogo

Chhota Bheem Aur Krishna
Chhota Bheem & Krishna: Pataliputra- City of the Dead
Chhota Bheem: Bheem vs Aliens
Chhota Bheem: Journey To Petra
Chhota Bheem & Krishna: Mayanagari
Chhota Bheem: Master of Shaolin
Chhota Bheem: Dholakpur to Kathmandu
Chhota Bheem Aur Hanuman
Chhota Bheem: The Rise Of Kirmada
Chhota Bheem Aur Ganesh: In The Amazing Odyssey
Chhota Bheem junglee kabila/Broken Amulet
Chhota Bheem And The Crown of Valahalla
Chhota Bheem and the Incan Adventure
Chhota Bheem aur Krishna vs Zimbara
Chhota Bheem And The Shinobi Secret
Chhota Bheem Neeli Pahaadi
Chhota Bheem Banjara Masti
Chhota Bheem Dus Pe Dus
Chhota Bheem Mayavi Gorgan
Chhota Bheem ki baazi
Chhota Bheem aur Paanch Ajoobe
Chhota Bheem Mission Mangalyaan
Chhota Bheem And The Sky Dragon
 Chhota Bheem: Kung Fu Dhamaka 
 Chhota Chintu Bada Feku 
 Chhota Chintu Bada Baazigar
Mighty Raju vs The Great Pirate
Mighty Raju and The Magnetors
Mighty Raju and The Commandos
Mighty Raju vs Mighty Clone
Chak De ! Mighty Raju
Game Over Mighty Raju
Mighty Raju In School's Cool
Mighty Raju In Aryanagar Underwater
Mighty Raju In Battery Low
Mighty Raju: Aamna Samna
Mighty Raju: Bachhon Ka Khel
Mighty Raju: Space Race
Mighty Raju: Chhutti Ho Gayi
Mighty Raju: 3 Villains
Mighty Raju: Superhero School
Mighty Raju: Hijack
Mighty Raju: Mighty Khiladi Raju
Mighty Raju: Time Travel
Mighty Raju: Ice Ice Mighty
Mighty Raju aur alien dost 
Sholay Adventures

Sony Yay
 Honey Bunny In Bank Robbery
 Sab Jholmaal Hai – Honey Bunny Ka Space Adventure
 Honey Bunny Gangs of Film City
 Honey Bunny in Police Petrol
 Paap-O-Meter Under Attack
 Paap-O-Meter Defenders of Earth
 Honey Bunny Save The Panda
 Honey Bunny in The World Tour Challenge
 Tapu and the Big Fat Alien Wedding

Zee Kannada
Siddhi Vinayak

Footnotes

See also 

 History of animation in India
 History of Disney in India
 Indian animation industry
 List of Indian animated television series
 List of anime distributed in India

References 

Animated